Steve Mark (15 March 1966 – 20 June 2016) was a Grenadian international footballer who played as a defender.

In 1989, he was awarded the 'MVP' award for his performances during the 1989 regional Caribbean competition. He also participated in FIFA World Cup qualifiers for Grenada in 1998, making two appearances. On 20 June 2016, Mark stabbed his wife to death and then committed suicide at their home in Fulham.

References 

1966 births
2016 deaths
2016 suicides
Grenadian footballers
Grenada international footballers
Association football defenders
Deaths by stabbing in London
Suicides by sharp instrument in England
Murder–suicides in the United Kingdom
Suicides in Fulham
Grenadian murderers